Sky Racket is a video game developed by Brazilian indie game developer Double Dash Studios. Originally named RacketBoy, the development began in 2015 at Indie Vs Gamers, a 72-hour game jam hosted by Game Jolt. The game was featured on PAX East 2019. It was released for Microsoft Windows, macOS and Linux on October 22, 2019, with a console launch set for 2020. The game is a mixture of block breakers and shoot 'em ups (its cartoon environments make it a cute 'em up), which makes it the first Shmup Breaker.
The animated intro was featured on Tokyo Game Show.

Gameplay 
After choosing between RacketGirl and RacketBoy (or both, as the game has local co-op mode), The gameplay focuses on dodging enemies and laser beams while hitting energy balls back at the enemies as the player flies through the worlds. It's an easy to pick-up game with gameplay rooted in classic 16-bit arcade games with uncomplicated controls. At the end of each level (referred to in-game as a set), the score made during the match and the achievements are shown.

The main adventure sprawls over 5 different worlds with different sets and boss fights (referred to as match points), which are accessed through a map. Each world has its unique quirks with different mechanics, enemies and extra objectives. During the game the players can rescue Buddies who can then be used in earlier levels, giving them new ways to replay and improve their performances.

Plot 
RacketGirl and RacketBoy are guardians chosen by the Capybara Goddess to save the galaxy from the paws of the terrible tyrant genius, Korrg.

They fly through colorful planets and fight against hordes of crazy enemies to save the galaxy. Armed with magical Sky Rackets, they deflect attacks made by enemies. They fight against giant banana monsters, luchador raccoons and sentient popcorn in order to eventually reach the evil tyrant Korrg and save the imprisoned Capybara Goddess that watches over the galaxy.

Reception

Achievements and Accolades

Indie Vs Gamers

SBGames

Indie Megabooth

BIG Festival

References

External links 

Sky Racket Nominated for IGN's BIG Festival 2019 (Portuguese)

Indie video games
2019 video games
Video games developed in Brazil